DigVentures is a social enterprise organising crowdfunded archaeological excavation experiences. It is registered with the Chartered Institute for Archaeologists (CIfA), and is a CIfA Accredited Field School.

Background 
Headquartered in Barnard Castle with offices across the UK, DigVentures is a platform that enables civic participation in archaeology and heritage projects. They have pioneered the use of crowdfunding, crowdsourcing and digital methods to increase access and opportunities for real people to purposefully participate in real research. 

The organisation was formed in 2011, responding to the challenge of austerity and lack of opportunity in the heritage sector. By adopting a crowdfunding and crowdsourcing approach, DigVentures have sought to address this by using digital and social media to build audiences, increase revenue and find new ways for the public to participate in archaeological fieldwork.

Crowdfunding model 
DigVentures projects are coordinated through their proprietary online multicurrency crowdfunding platform designed to connect heritage sector managers and archaeologists (project owners) with a worldwide crowd of interested and actively engaged participants. To date, the team has raised approximately £2m in crowdfunding and matched grant finance. The archive of funded projects is available on the DV website.

Digital Dig Team 
In 2014 DigVentures received a grant from the Heritage Lottery Fund to develop its Digital Dig Team. This has been described as a ‘Community Management System’ for archaeology projects. It is built onto a cloud-based, open-source software platform enabling researchers to publish data directly from the field using any web-enabled device (such as a smartphone or tablet) into a live relational database. Once recorded the born-digital archive is accessible via open-access on a dedicated website, and published to social profiles of all project participants. Beta tested in the field at Leiston Abbey in 2014, early results have shown that the Digital Dig Team system can enable archaeologists to build audiences (through immersive storytelling), generate revenue (through crowdfunding), enable public participation (through crowdsourcing) and improve research by making results available to a networked specialist team in 'real time'. A children's version of this system has also been developed, based on a ‘Cyber Dig’ simulated excavation for use in schools or family events.

During the COVID-19 pandemic, DigVentures's digs, talks and workshops were postponed, and the online "How to Do Archaeology" course was made freely available.

Fieldwork

Flag Fen Lives 
In 2012 DigVentures ran the world's first crowdfunded excavation, raising £30,000 to enable a three-week excavation at the internationally significant Bronze Age site of Flag Fen, near Peterborough. The site had experienced a 50% decline in visitors since the large-scale English Heritage-funded excavations finished in 1995; the project's remit was to help revitalise the heritage attraction, whilst providing detailed scientific information on the preservation of the waterlogged timbers. The project involved around 250 members of the public from 11 countries, supported by a specialist team including partners from the British Museum, Durham University, Birmingham University, York Archaeological Trust, University College London and English Heritage to assist in the scientific investigations. Of the members of public, 130 individuals received hands-on training in archaeological techniques on site and visitor numbers increased by 29% from the previous year. Francis Pryor, who discovered the site in the 1970s, was supportive of the initiative and wrote afterwards: "happily, it was an experiment that worked: the participants had a good time, and the archaeology was professionally excavated, to a very high standard".

Leiston Abbey 
Leiston Abbey was the first crowdfunding campaign to run on the DigStarter platform in 2013, and has since raised more than £36,000 over two seasons. The project is ongoing and is currently entering the third year of five proposed digging seasons. Its wider rationale has been to breathe new life into Leiston Abbey, providing opportunities for visitors to join in with the excavation, and to integrate the heritage attraction with the artistic and musical life of the onsite music school, Pro Corda, who manage the site for English Heritage. Fieldwork has so far focused on characterising undefined earthworks and settlement evidence in three different areas of the site, with a programme of remote sensing used to target thirteen small-scale excavation trenches aiming to identify settlement evidence indicated by geophysical anomalies or extant earthworks. Additional work included a photogrammetry survey to produce a metrically accurate 3D digital elevation model of the Abbey Church and a low-level aerial photography survey using kite mounted cameras and UAVs (drones) to assess structural evidence for absent buildings associated with the eastern range.

Dirty Weekends 
DigVentures also runs short taster sessions and masterclasses by experts in their respective subjects.
2013: River Thames Foreshore, working with the Thames Discovery Programme (2 weekends)
2013: As part of the two-week summer dig at Leiston Abbey; classes in geophysics and archaeological photography.
2014: As part of the two-week summer dig at Leiston Abbey; classes in post-medieval pottery and archaeological photography.
2015: Poulton, near Chester, opportunity to work with The Poulton Research Project on their large multi-period site.
2015: As part of the two-week summer dig at Leiston Abbey; classes in post-medieval pottery and archaeological photography.

Further reading 
'2015 Leiston Abbey crowdfunding campaign launched, Apr 2015'
'DigVentures in Current Archaeology magazine, May 2015: "The 'Real-Time' Team" (pdf)'
'DigVentures website'
'Digital Dig Team: Leiston Abbey'
'BBC News: Leiston Abbey dig: Earspoon' and evidence of 'mill' uncovered, Dec 2014'
'BBC’s ‘The One Show’ "Black Shuck", Oct 2014'
'BBC News: "Leiston Abbey dig unearths 'poker chip' and curse tablet", July 2014'
'Guardian Interview with DigVentures’ Projects Director, Mar 2014'
'Leiston Abbey 2014 Evaluation Assessment Report (pdf)'
'Leiston Abbey 2014 Updated Project Design (pdf)'
'Leiston Abbey 2013 Evaluation Assessment Report (pdf)'
'Flag Fen Lives on BBC Look East'
'DigVentures in Current Archaeology magazine, Nov 2012: "DigVentures at Flag Fen"'
'Digventures interview with The Archaeologist magazine, Summer 2012'

References

Crowdfunding platforms of the United Kingdom
Archaeological organizations